The 2009 Assen Superbike World Championship round will be the fourth round of the 2009 Superbike World Championship season. It took place on the weekend of April 24–26, 2009 at the TT Circuit Assen located in Assen, Netherlands.

Results

Superbike race 1

Superbike race 2

Supersport race

References
 Superbike Race 1 (Archived 2009-06-11)
 Superbike Race 2
 Supersport Race

External links
 The official website of the TT Circuit Assen
 The official website of the Superbike World Championship

Assen Round